This is a timeline documenting the formative events in heavy metal music before 1970.

Since the dawn of rock music in the 1950s and continuing through the 1960s, various artists pushed the boundaries of the genre to emphasize speed, aggression, volume, theatricality, and other elements that became staples of the heavy metal style. In the late 1960s, this experimentation coalesced into various rock subgenres like hard rock, acid rock, and psychedelic rock, which were all influential in the development of heavy metal.

Bands formed

1959
 The Kingsmen

1960
 The Beatles
 Los Dug Dug's

1961
 Bob Seger (early work)
 Golden Earring

1962
 The Rolling Stones
 The Guess Who
 David Bowie
 Status Quo
 Eric Clapton

1963
 The Animals
 The Pretty Things
 Billy Thorpe & The Aztecs
The Yardbirds
 Neil Young

1964
 Captain Beefheart 
 The Fugs
 The Mothers of Invention
 Los Saicos
 Lynyrd Skynyrd
 MC5
 The Monks
 Donovan
 The Amboy Dukes
 The Kinks
 The Troggs
 The Velvet Underground
 The Who

1965
Bob Dylan and the Hawks
13th Floor Elevators
 Big Brother and the Holding Company
 Scorpions
 Flamin' Groovies
 The Grateful Dead
 Jefferson Airplane
Love (band)
 The Doors
 The Move
 Pink Floyd
 Stack Waddy

1966
 Black Widow
 Blue Cheer
 Buffalo Springfield
 Cream
 The Deviants (band)
 The Jimi Hendrix Experience
The Human Instinct 
 Steve Miller Band
 James Gang
 Iron Butterfly
 Os Mutantes
 Slade
 Yesterday's Children

1967
 Blue Öyster Cult (as Soft White Underbelly)
 Budgie
 The Crazy World of Arthur Brown
 Crow
 Creedence Clearwater Revival
 Elf
 Fleetwood Mac (early work)
 Flower Travellin' Band
 Genesis
 The Gun
 Sammy Hagar
 The Jeff Beck Group
 Jethro Tull
 Les Rallizes Dénudés
 Morgen (band) 
 Pärson Sound 
 Santana
 The Savage Resurrection
 Spooky Tooth
 Steppenwolf
 The Stooges
 T. Rex
 Vanilla Fudge

1968
 Accept
 Alice Cooper
 Black Sabbath
 Breakout
 Deep Purple
 Edgar Broughton Band
 Free
 Grand Funk Railroad
 Humble Pie
 Juan de la Cruz Band
 Led Zeppelin
 Meat Loaf
 Nazareth
 Rush
 Sir Lord Baltimore
 Sweet
 Warpig
 Writing on the Wall
 Yes

1969
 Aguaturbia
 April Wine
 Argent
 Atomic Rooster
 Blackfoot
 Bloodrock
 Cactus
 Coven
 Creation 
 Cromagnon
 Crushed Butler
 Dust
 Focus 
 Gary Moore
 Gypsy Sun and Rainbows
 Hawkwind
 High Tide
 Randy Holden
 Iron Claw
 Josefus
 Judas Priest
 King Crimson
 Leaf Hound
 Mahogany Rush
 May Blitz
 Mott the Hoople
 Mountain
 Thin Lizzy
 Tucky Buzzard
 UFO
 Uriah Heep
 Wishbone Ash
 ZZ Top

Songs

pre-1960
 "How Many More Years" by Howlin' Wolf
 "I Put a Spell On You" by Screamin' Jay Hawkins
 “Jailhouse Rock” by Elvis Presley
 "Rumble" by Link Wray
 "Love Me" by Jerry Lott (as the Phantom)
 "Boogie In The Park" by Joe Hill Louis
 "Rockin' This Joint Tonight" by Kid Thomas
 "Suzie Q" by Dale Hawkins

1960
 "I Fought the Law" by The Crickets
 "Shakin' All Over" by Johnny Kidd & the Pirates

1961
 "Jack the Ripper" by Screaming Lord Sutch
 "Don't Worry" by Marty Robbins

1962
 "Miserlou" by Dick Dale
 "Palisades Park" by Freddy Cannon

1963
 "Louie Louie" by The Kingsmen
 "Surfin' Bird" by The Trashmen

1964
"You Really Got Me" and "All Day and All of the Night" by The Kinks

1965
"Action" by Freddy Cannon
"My Generation" by The Who
 "The Train Kept A-Rollin'" by The Yardbirds

1966
"Inside-Looking Out" by The Animals
"96 Tears" by ? and the Mysterians
"Talk Talk" by The Music Machine
"Wild Thing" by The Troggs

1967
"I Can See for Miles" by The Who
"Mr. Soul" by Buffalo Springfield
"Purple Haze" by The Jimi Hendrix Experience
"Sunshine of Your Love" by Cream
"White Rabbit" & "Somebody to Love" by Jefferson Airplane
 "Down on Me" by Big Brother and the Holding Company
 "Street Singer" by Clear Light

1968
"Fire" by The Crazy World of Arthur Brown
"Born to Be Wild" by Steppenwolf
"Voodoo Child" by The Jimi Hendrix Experience
"Helter Skelter" by The Beatles
"The House at Pooneil Corners" by Jefferson Airplane
’’Hurdy Gurdy Man’’ by Donovan 
 "A Trial In Our Native Town" by Savage Rose
"In-A-Gadda-Da-Vida" by Iron Butterfly
"Race With the Devil" by The Gun
" Summertime Blues" by Blue Cheer
"Five To One" by The Doors

1969
"Dazed and Confused" by Led Zeppelin
"The Nile Song" by Pink Floyd
"21st Century Schizoid Man" by King Crimson
"Fortunate Son" by Creedence Clearwater Revival
"Whole Lotta Love" by Led Zeppelin
"Peace Loving Man" by Blossom Toes
"Evil Woman" by Crow
"Better by You, Better Than Me" by Spooky Tooth
"Oceans Inside Me" by Stone Garden

Albums

1964
 The Kinks - Kinks

1965
 The Kinks - Kinda Kinks
 The Kinks - Kinks-Size
 The Kinks - The Kink Kontroversy
 The Pretty Things - The Pretty Things
 The Pretty Things - Get the Picture?
 The Sonics - Here Are The Sonics
 The Who - My Generation
 The Yardbirds - For Your Love
 The Yardbirds - Having a Rave Up

1966
 Cream - Fresh Cream
 The Kinks - Face to Face
 The Who - A Quick One
 The Yardbirds - Roger the Engineer

1967
 Cream - Disraeli Gears
 The Jimi Hendrix Experience - Are You Experienced
 The Jimi Hendrix Experience - Axis: Bold as Love
 The Kinks - Something Else by The Kinks
 The Pretty Things - Emotions
 Vanilla Fudge - Vanilla Fudge
 The Who - The Who Sell Out
 The Yardbirds - Little Games

1968
 The Jeff Beck Group - Truth
 The Crazy World of Arthur Brown - The Crazy World of Arthur Brown
 The Velvet Underground - White Light/White Heat
 Blue Cheer - Vincebus Eruptum
 Blue Cheer - Outsideinside
 Cream - Wheels of Fire
 Deep Purple - Shades of Deep Purple
 The Jimi Hendrix Experience - Electric Ladyland
 Iron Butterfly - Heavy
 Iron Butterfly - In-A-Gadda-Da-Vida
 The Kinks - The Kinks Are the Village Green Preservation Society
 The Pretty Things - SF Sorrow
 Steppenwolf - Steppenwolf
 Steppenwolf - Steppenwolf the Second
 Vanilla Fudge - The Beat Goes On
 Vanilla Fudge - Renaissance

1969
 The Jeff Beck Group - Beck-Ola
 Blue Cheer - New! Improved! Blue Cheer
 Blue Cheer - Blue Cheer
 Alice Cooper - Pretties for You
 Coven - Witchcraft Destroys Minds and Reaps Souls
 Cream - Goodbye
 Deep Purple - Deep Purple
 Deep Purple - The Book of Taliesyn
 Edgar Broughton Band - Wasa Wasa
 Grand Funk Railroad - On Time
 Grand Funk Railroad - Grand Funk
 High Tide - Sea Shanties
 Humble Pie - As Safe As Yesterday Is
 Humble Pie - Town and Country
 Iron Butterfly - Ball
 King Crimson - In the Court of the Crimson King
 The Kinks - Arthur (Or the Decline and Fall of the British Empire)
 The Velvet Underground - The Velvet Underground
 Led Zeppelin - Led Zeppelin
 Led Zeppelin - Led Zeppelin II
 MC5 - Kick Out the Jams
 Mott the Hoople - Mott the Hoople
 Slade - Beginnings
 Steppenwolf - At Your Birthday Party
 Steppenwolf - Monster
 The Stooges - The Stooges
 Vanilla Fudge - Near the Beginning
 Vanilla Fudge - Rock & Roll
 The Who - Tommy

Notes

References
 
 
 
 
 
 
 
 
 
 
 
 

1960s in heavy metal music
1960s in music